Fall Apart may refer to:

"Fall Apart", a song by Sarah Connor from her 2008 album Sexy as Hell
"Fall Apart", a song by Maps & Atlases from their 2018 album Lightlessness Is Nothing New
"Fall Apart", a song by Tones and I from her 2021 album Welcome to the Madhouse
"Fall Apart", a 2021 song by Renforshort

See also
Falls Apart (disambiguation)